"Love Falls Over Me" is a song by Canadian recording artist Tamia. It was written by Tamia along with Warren Felder, Alicia Renee Williams, and Andrew Wansel for her sixth studio album Love Life (2015), while production was helmed by Felder and Wansel under their production moniker Pop & Oak. A sensual electro R&B song that has the singer gushing over the man who fills in her blanks, it was released as the album's third single on November 4, 2015. Pushed by several commissioned dance remixes that were produced by DJs Bobby Blanco, Desperados, and Stonebridge, it reached number 21 on the US Billboard Dance Club Songs chart.

Critical reception
"Love Falls Over Me" received generally positive reviews from music critics. Renowned for Sound editor Marcus Floyd found that the song is "this breezy R&B infused jam with some smooth and luscious vocals" and further remarked: "Tamia sure knows how to carry a tune." ABC News journalist Allan Raible felt that the "opener is a timeless piece of glowing, electro R&B [and] another possible hit."

Format and track listing
Digital download
 "Love Falls Over Me" – 3:31

Credits and personnel 
Credits adapted from the liner notes of Love Life.

Jeremy Brown – engineering assistance
Kevin "KD" Davis – mixing
Chris Gehringer – mastering
Tamia Hill – vocals, writer

Warren Felder – production, writer
Mark "Exit" Goodchild – engineering
Andrew Wansel – production, writer
Alicia Renee Williams –  writer

Charts

References

External links
 TamiaWorld.com — official site

2015 songs
2015 singles
Tamia songs
Def Jam Recordings singles
Songs written by Pop Wansel
Songs written by Oak Felder
Song recordings produced by Pop & Oak
Songs written by Tamia